Marquis of Carabas or Marquis de Carabas may refer to:

Fiction
 The Marquis of Carabas (also known as Master-At-Arms), a 1940 novel by Rafael Sabatini
 The Marquis of Carabas' Picture Book, an old collection of children's stories, including Puss in Boots, illustrated by Walter Crane
 "Marquis de Carabas" (FLCL), the third episode of the anime FLCL

Characters
 A fictional nobleman in the fairy tale Puss in Boots
 A character in the BBC TV series Neverwhere and its novelisation, both written by Neil Gaiman
 A character in the webcomic No Rest for the Wicked
 The Marquess of Carabas, a character in Benjamin Disraeli's novel Vivian Grey

See also
The Marquis of Carumbas, a fictional character in The Incredible Adventures of Jack Flanders

Carabas